Carl Mokosak (born September 22, 1962) is a Canadian former professional ice hockey player. He played in a total of 83 games in the National Hockey League with the Calgary Flames, Los Angeles Kings, Philadelphia Flyers, Pittsburgh Penguins, and Boston Bruins between 1981 and 1989. Mokosak played left wing and scored 11 goals while adding 15 assists over his NHL career. The rest of his career, which lasted from 1982 to 1991, was spent in various minor leagues.

Born in Fort Saskatchewan, Alberta, Mokosak played junior hockey for the Brandon Wheat Kings. In 1982, Mokosak had a tryout with the Calgary Flames who signed him to a contract. The following season, he played 41 games for the Flames. Mokosak would play until the 1990–91 season, mostly in the minor leagues with several stints in the NHL. 

Carl is the brother of John Mokosak. He now coaches Rams Hockey in Rockford, Michigan.

Career statistics

Regular season and playoffs

External links
 

1962 births
Living people
Baltimore Skipjacks players
Boston Bruins players
Brandon Wheat Kings players
Calgary Flames players
Canadian ice hockey left wingers
Fort Wayne Komets players
Ice hockey people from Alberta
Hershey Bears players
Indianapolis Ice players
Los Angeles Kings players
Maine Mariners players
Muskegon Lumberjacks players
New Haven Nighthawks players
Oklahoma City Stars players
People from Fort Saskatchewan
Philadelphia Flyers players
Phoenix Roadrunners (IHL) players
Pittsburgh Penguins players
San Diego Gulls (IHL) players
Undrafted National Hockey League players